Montessori Middle School is a Montessori school, grades 5 through 8, located in Louisville, Tennessee. The facility was built in 2008 on a rural property once a cattle farm. It is the first Montessori school for adolescents in East Tennessee and one of the first in the Southeast.

Teaching philosophy
The land-based school follows the "erdkinder" or "earth children" philosophy of Maria Montessori. In keeping with this land-based model, Montessori Middle is a producing member of the Maryville Farmers' Market

Events
Events at the school have included a six-week summer day camp program in June and July 2009 and a Farm Festival in May 2008.

References

External links

Montessori Middle School blog

Montessori schools in the United States
Private middle schools in Tennessee
Schools in Blount County, Tennessee